Gong Xiaosheng (born 1953) is a Chinese ambassador.
From 1980 to 1984 he was Third Secretary in Cairo (Egypt).
 From November 2002 to July 2005 he was ambassador to the Palestinian National Authority.
 From September 2006 to October 2008 he was ambassador to Amman (Jordan).
 From October 2008 to July 2014 was ambassador in Ankara (Turkey).
From  until September 2019 he was China's Special Envoy on the Middle East Issue.

References

1953 births
Living people
People from Shandong
Ambassadors of China to Jordan
Ambassadors of China to Turkey
Politicians from Shandong